Mapitigama Buddharakkitha (1921−1967) was the chief conspirator of the assassination of fourth Prime Minister of Ceylon (later Sri Lanka), S. W. R. D. Bandaranaike. He served as the chief incumbent (chief priest) of the Kelaniya Raja Maha Vihara, one of the most sacred Buddhist temples in Sri Lanka from 1947 to 1959.

Background
Buddharakkitha played an important role in bringing S. W. R. D. Bandaranaike to power in 1956 parliamentary elections. He was the driving force behind the Eksath Bhikku Peramuna or the United Bhikku Front. He has been described as a virtual kingmaker at that time. Later, he attributed Bandaranaike's failure to aggressively pursue the nationalist reforms as the sole motive to assassinate him. But it was revealed that the real motive for the assassination came as a result of the Prime Minister's refusal to award business deals, in particular, a government contract for the construction of a sugar factory and government concessions for a shipping company he planned to set up. Talduwe Somarama, another Buddhist monk killed Bandaranaike on September 25, 1959, under the direction of Buddharakkitha.

Notoriety
Buddharakkitha's various notorious acts only surfaced after he was convicted. He was described as a rich businessman who was involved in various high profile businesses. Buddharakkitha routinely consumed whisky, which was an offense for a buddhist monk. He allegedly had a sexual relationship with Vimala Wijewardene MP, Minister of Health and the only woman member of the Bandaranaike's Cabinet in 1959. Wimala Wijewardene was the sister-in-law of D. R. Wijewardena and the widow of Don Charles Wijewardene, author of The Revolt in the Temple(1953). She was also a grand-aunt of Ranil Wickremasinghe, former Prime Minister and current President of Sri Lanka.

Aftermath
Surprisingly, the first person to express his anger and sadness over Radio Ceylon (the only radio broadcasting service at the time) on the attempt to kill the Prime Minister was Mapitigama Buddharakkitha. The Sri Lankan Government called Scotland Yard to undertake extensive investigations of the incident. Investigations revealed that Buddharakkitha was the mastermind behind the assassination. Subsequent court case sentenced him to death in 1961. The sentence was later changed to one of life imprisonment. He died in 1967 by heart attack following 6 years of hard labour.

See also
Talduwe Somarama

Further reading
 A.C. Alles, Famous Criminal Cases of Sri Lanka, Volume III: The Assassination of Prime Minister SWRD Bandaranaike (Dec-1979): Published by the author. Hardcover published by Vantage, Inc., N.Y., U.S.A. 1986 as The Assassination of a Prime Minister. . 
Lucian G. Weeramantry, The Assassination of a Prime Minister - The Bandaranaike Murder Case (Hardcover, Geneva, Switzerland, 1969).
 Firoze Sameer, dOSSIEr COREA: A portfolio on crime (Colombo, Sri Lanka, 1999) .
Seneviratne, H.L: Buddhist monks and ethnic politics. Anthropology Today, April 2001; 17(2): 15-21.
Sri Kantha Sachi: Prime Minister Solomon Bandaranaike Assassination Revisited after 50 years. Part 1 - Politics, Sept. 26, 2009. 
 https://sangam.org/2009/09/Bandaranaike_Assassination.php?uid=3691
Sri Kantha Sachi: Prime Minister Solomon Bandaranaike Assassination Revisited after 50 years. Part 2 - Politics, Oct.3, 2009.
 https://sangam.org/2009/10/Bandaranaike_Assassinations.php
Sri Kantha Sachi: Prime Minister Solomon Bandaranaike Assassination Revisited after 50 years. Part 3 - Theatrics and Economics, Oct.10, 2009.
 https://sangam.org/2009/10/Bandaranaike_Assassination_3.php?uid=3710

References

External links
Prime Minister Solomon Bandaranaike Assassination Revisited after 50 Years

Sri Lankan Buddhists
People convicted of murder by Sri Lanka
Sri Lankan people convicted of murder
Assassins of heads of government
1967 deaths
1921 births